Joint Rescue Coordination Centre is a specific Rescue coordination centre and may refer to:

Canada
 Joint Rescue Coordination Centre Halifax
 Joint Rescue Coordination Centre Trenton
 Joint Rescue Coordination Centre Victoria

Norway
 Joint Rescue Coordination Centre of Northern Norway
 Joint Rescue Coordination Centre of Southern Norway